Posterior intercostal may refer to:

Posterior intercostal artery
Posterior intercostal vein